U.S. Route 4 (US 4) in the U.S. state of Vermont extends for  between the New York state line at Fair Haven and the New Hampshire state line at White River Junction. It is one of the main arteries between New York and New Hampshire.

Route description
Upon crossing into Vermont from New York, US 4 immediately expands from a two-lane highway to a four-lane expressway. US 4 changes from being signed north–south (in New York) to being signed east–west (in Vermont). The historic routing of US 4 runs nearby as Vermont Route 4A (VT 4A), which later becomes US 4 Business (US 4 Bus.) as it enters the town of Rutland.

The  US 4 expressway was built in anticipation of the proposed, but never built, East–West Highway which was supposed to link the population centers of northern New England. As such, this section of freeway meets Interstate Highway standards. The freeway has junctions with VT 22A in Fair Haven and VT 30 in Castleton. In West Rutland, the last numbered exit on the highway, exit 6, leads to US 4 Bus., which provides access to the town centers of West Rutland and Rutland town. The expressway veers south just outside the limits of Rutland city, ending at an at-grade intersection with US 7 south of the city.

US 4 overlaps with US 7 north into downtown Rutland, meeting the east end of its business route along the way. US 4 then leaves US 7 along Woodstock Avenue as it heads northeast out of the city. East of Rutland city, US 4 is a two-lane highway, meandering through the Green Mountains and passing by the town center of Mendon toward the town of Killington. In Killington, US 4 joins VT 100 as they pass through Killington center along the Ottauquechee River valley until the village of West Bridgewater at the Bridgewater town line. VT 100 splits off to the south while US 4 continues following the Ottauquechee River east through Bridgewater center into the town of Woodstock. Several miles later, US 4 enters the incorporated village of Woodstock, where it meets VT 12 and VT 106. Southbound VT 12 and eastbound US 4 overlap for about  along the river and split in the Taftsville Historic District, in the northwest corner of the town of Hartland.

US 4 continues following the Ottauquechee River into the town of Hartford, passing through the Quechee State Park and circling south of Deweys Pond to cross the river on the Quechee Gorge Bridge, before heading north to the south bank of the White River. Here, US 4 has an interchange with Interstate 89 (I-89), then turns eastward following the river bank into the village of White River Junction. In the village, US 4 joins US 5 as they cross the White River. At a four-way intersection immediately after the crossing, US 5 continues north, VT 14 begins to the west, and US 4 continues to the east. US 4 crosses the New Hampshire state line at the Connecticut River after a quarter of a mile.

History

The road running from the New York state line (toward Whitehall, New York) at Fair Haven eastward through Rutland and Woodstock to White River Junction was designated as Route 13 of the New England road marking system in 1922. In late 1926, Route 13 was incorporated into the newly established U.S. Numbered Highway System as US 4. In the 1960s, construction of the  expressway section of US 4 began. The middle segment of the expressway from exit 5 in Castleton to exit 6 in West Rutland opened to traffic in 1969. Two years later, the western segment from the New York line in Fair Haven to exit 5 also opened. The original surface alignment of US 4 was redesignated as VT 4A. The construction of the eastern segment (from exit 6 to the intersection with US 7) was delayed for several years and did not open to traffic until 1986. The original surface alignment east of exit 6 was redesignated as US 4 Bus.

Future

There have been calls for construction of an east–west interstate freeway in New England. 

Northern New England is served by three north–south freeways radiating generally northwards from Boston, Massachusetts—from east to west, I-95, I-93, and US 3, all coming from or through Greater Boston; and westernmost of all, by I-91, which follows the Connecticut River. However, the northernmost complete east–west freeway existing within the region, I-90, does not enter northern New England. Continuous east–west freeway travel through (and within) northern New England is presently accomplished by three segments, only one of which is truly east–west.

There are a handful of alternate east–west roadways, including US 2 between Montpelier, Vermont, and Bangor, Maine; US 302 between Montpelier and Portland, US 4 from the New York–Vermont border to Portsmouth, New Hampshire; and VT 9/New Hampshire Route 9 between Bennington, Vermont, and the Concord, New Hampshire, area. These alternatives are mostly not limited access or designed for higher speed travel.

Major intersections

Special routes

 US 4 Alt.: Fair Haven to West Rutland
 US 4 Bus.: Rutland

References

External links

 US 4 Exits

04-0
Transportation in Rutland County, Vermont
Transportation in Windsor County, Vermont
 Vermont